"I Will Dance with You" is a song written by Jack Wesley Routh and originally released by Johnny Cash  as the opening track on his 1977 studio album The Last Gunfighter Ballad.

In 1981, a new Johnny Cash song titled "The Baron" was coupled with "I Will Dance with You" for a single release.

Karen Brooks and Johnny Cash duet version 

In 1985 the song hit the country charts in a duet version by Karen Brooks and Johnny Cash.

Track listing

Charts

References

External links 
 "I Will Dance with You" (from the album The Last Gunfighter Ballad) on the Johnny Cash official website
 "I Will Dance with You" (from Karen Brooks' album Hearts on Fire) on the Johnny Cash official website

Karen Brooks songs
Johnny Cash songs
Songs written by Jack Routh
1985 songs
1985 singles
Warner Records singles